Johnson Kere is a sprinter from the Solomon Islands.

Kere was a member of the first ever team that the Solomon Islands sent to the Olympics when they competed at the 1984 Summer Olympics which were held in Los Angeles. He competed in the 100 metres and finished 7th in his heat, so failed to advance to the next round.

References

External links
 

Living people
Solomon Islands male sprinters
Athletes (track and field) at the 1984 Summer Olympics
Olympic athletes of the Solomon Islands
Year of birth missing (living people)